Lillian Bradley may refer to:
 Lillian K. Bradley (1921–1995), American mathematician and mathematics educator
 Lillian Trimble Bradley (1875–1959), American theatrical director and playwright